Otto Wittwer (born December 24, 1937) is a retired Swiss professional ice hockey player who represented the Swiss national team at the 1964 Winter Olympics.

References

External links
 

1937 births
Living people
Ice hockey players at the 1964 Winter Olympics
Olympic ice hockey players of Switzerland
SC Langnau players
Swiss ice hockey forwards